Szadkowski (feminine: Szadkowska) is a Polish locational surname and means a person from a place in Poland called Szadek, Szadki or Szadkowice. A variant: Szatkowski. 

The surname may refer to:

 (1920-1990), Polish artist, sculptor, and educator
Zuzanna Szadkowski (born 1978), American actress
 (1912-1995), Polish emigre politician, officer of the Polish Armed Forces in the West, social and scout activist

References

Polish-language surnames